Sonia Guirado Crespo (born 16 November 1976) is a retired Spanish Paralympic swimmer who competed in backstroke and freestyle swimming events in international level events.

References

1976 births
Living people
People from Badalona
Sportspeople from the Province of Barcelona
Swimmers from Barcelona
Paralympic swimmers of Spain
Swimmers at the 1992 Summer Paralympics
Swimmers at the 1996 Summer Paralympics
Medalists at the 1992 Summer Paralympics
Paralympic medalists in swimming
Paralympic gold medalists for Spain
Paralympic bronze medalists for Spain
Spanish female freestyle swimmers
Spanish female backstroke swimmers
S2-classified Paralympic swimmers
Medalists at the World Para Swimming Championships